Lieux Dressler (born 27 February 1930) is an American film and television actress.

Life
Before becoming known as an actress, Dressler worked as a nightclub singer in Dallas. During this time, she was married to trombonist Morris Repass, with whom she had two sons. In the 1960s, her marriage ended, and she moved to Los Angeles to pursue an acting career. She operated an acting workshop named the Patio Playhouse, where she developed techniques that continue to be taught at acting classes.

During the 1970s, she appeared on various television series, including Columbo, Gunsmoke, Kolchak: the Night Stalker, and The Rockford Files. She also appeared in feature films, most notably Truck Stop Women (1974), Kingdom of the Spiders (1977), and Point of No Return (1993), and then she retired from acting.

Filmography (selected)
 1970: That Girl (episode "Stocks & the Single Girl")
 1971: Columbo (episode "Death Lends a Hand")
 1971–1973: Gunsmoke (5 episodes)
 1972: Grave of the Vampire
 1973: The Red Pony (television film)
 1974: Truck Stop Women
 1975: Kolchak: The Night Stalker (episode "The Knightly Murders")
 1976: The Rockford Files (episode "So Help Me God")
 1976: The Return of the World's Greatest Detective
 1976: Rich Man, Poor Man (episode "Part II: Chapters 3 and 4")
 1977: Kingdom of the Spiders
 1977: The Bob Newhart Show (episode "Death Be My Destiny") 
 1978–1983: Alice Grant- General Hospital 1978-83 
 1989: Days of Our Lives (3 episodes)
 1993: Point of No Return

References

External links

1930 births
American film actresses
American television actresses
Living people
21st-century American women